This is a list of Michigan Wolverines softball seasons. The Michigan Wolverines softball program is a college softball team that represents the University of Michigan in the Big Ten Conference of the National Collegiate Athletic Association. Michigan has played their home games at Alumni Field in Ann Arbor, Michigan since 1982. 

The Wolverines have won 22 conference regular season championships, ten conference tournaments, and have appeared in the NCAA Division I softball tournament 29 times, advancing to the Women's College World Series on 13 occasions, and have won the national championship once.

Season results

Notes

References

Michigan Wolverines softball seasons
Michigan
Michigan Wolverines softball seasons